Federal Governmental Institution — penal colony No. 6 of the Federal Penitentiary Service of Russia in Orenburg Oblast, commonly known as the Black Dolphin Prison, is a correctional facility in Sol-Iletsk, Orenburg Oblast, Russia, near its border with Kazakhstan. The prison is one of the oldest in Russia, and one of the first in the Orenburg Oblast to accept prisoners with life sentences. It gets its unofficial name from a prisoner-constructed sculpture depicting a black dolphin, which is set in front of the main entrance.

Originally, Black Dolphin was a jail (ostrog) for those sentenced to life at hard labor, since at least 1745. After the suppression of Pugachev's Rebellion in 1773, the prison was updated for the deportation and confinement of robbers. The prison houses approximately 700 of Russia's worst criminals, including child molesters, murderers, terrorists, cannibals, and serial killers. Prisoners at Black Dolphin are all serving sentences of life imprisonment. The prison began accepting these inmates on 1 November 2000.

Inmates are kept isolated in cells that have a set of three steel doors. For 90 minutes a day, they exercise in a large cage; during this time, cells are searched for contraband or illegal items. Inmates are also under 24-hour surveillance and supervision; they are not permitted to rest or sit on their bunks from the time they awake until bedtime (roughly 16 hours). When prison officers make a command to the inmates, they must respond with the words "yes, sir." Every 15 minutes, a guard makes rounds to ensure Black Dolphin inmates are complying with the rules. The prisoners are fed soup four times a day, and are only allowed books, newspapers, and a radio.

Prison guards place blindfolds on arriving inmates so that they cannot map out the prison or plan escapes. The inmates are also blindfolded whenever they are transported between buildings. Black Dolphin prison officers have a unique form of escorting inmates: Prisoners are kept bent over at the waist while a guard holds their handcuffed hands behind their back, higher than the hips. This escort control tactic allows for maximum brutal control while depriving the inmate of a view of his immediate surroundings (preventing him from escaping and/or attacking prison staff).

German actress Carola Neher died at Black Dolphin in 1942.

Notes

References

External links
Black Dolphin Prison - Federal Penitentiary Service for the Orenburg Oblast  (Archive)
"Black Dolphin Prison: Inside: Russia's Toughest Prisons."
Prisons in Russia
Buildings and structures in Orenburg Oblast
Prisons in the Soviet Union